Manitoba Provincial Highway 68 (PTH 68) is an east-west provincial highway in the central region of Manitoba, Canada. 

PTH 68 starts at PTH 5 east of Ste. Between the eastern junction with PTH 6 at Eriksdale and its western terminus, the highway is part of the Northern Woods and Water Route. The most notable portion of PTH 68 is the bridge over Lake Manitoba at The Narrows.

History
PTH 68 first appeared on the 1952 Manitoba Highway Map. Originally, the highway served as an east-west connector route within the Interlake region between PTH 8 and PTH 6 at Eriksdale.

In 1987, the highway was extended to its current westbound terminus, replacing PR 235 between Ste. Rose Du Lac and PTH 6.

Major intersections

References

068
Northern Woods and Water Route